Lydenburgia is a genus of plants in the family Celastraceae.

Two of the species in this genus, Lydenburgia cassinoides (Sekhukhuni bushman's tea) and Lydenburgia abbottii (Pondo bushman's tea), are protected trees in South Africa.

See also
List of Southern African indigenous trees

References

 
Protected trees of South Africa
Celastrales genera